"Breakaway" is a song from the album Another Place and Time by Donna Summer, recorded in 1989. The song was released in October 1989 as the fourth single from the album by Atlantic Records and Warner Bros. Records (Europe) and was a top 50 hit in UK. The song was written and produced by Stock, Aitken & Waterman.

Background and release
The album was written by popular British production team Stock, Aitken & Waterman and produced four UK hit singles, including the international smash "This Time I Know It's For Real". Three of these hits later turned up on a Europe-only compilation album entitled The Best of Donna Summer, released in 1990 by Warner Bros. Records. The album also included "Breakaway" which had previously only been released as a single in the US. However, due to the album's popularity and following the re-release of the 1982 hit "State of Independence" a brand new remixed version of "Breakaway" by Phil Harding and Ian Curnow was issued in the single form.

The original 1989 release of "Breakaway" was the third and final single to be released in the United States from Another Place and Time. The song was serviced to radio stations on promo 45s and cd singles. The track was also remixed by Tony Humphries as "The Extended Power Mix" and "The Power Radio Mix" for the US 12" single. The "Breakaway" US 12" single was backed with the extended version of "I Don't Wanna Get Hurt", which had already been released in the UK as the follow up to "This Time I Know It's For Real". Despite its original A/C feel and house influenced remixes, the track did not chart in the US.

Critical reception
A reviewer from Music & Media commented, "...originally produced by Stock, Aitken & Waterman, this is the remix by Harding/Curnow. One of the most added records this week, it's bound to be a winter hit for Donna." Pop Rescue stated that "Breakaway" "musically sounds like nothing else" on Another Place and Time, noticed "its slight Latin sound" which it considered as the possible reason for which it achieved success in Brazil, but added that "this isn't the strongest song that SAW release despite its positive and uplifting lyrics".

Charts
"Breakaway" managed to enter the UK top 50, peaking at number 49. Even though the single was not very successful in most English-speaking countries, it proved to be surprisingly well received in Latin America, where it charted in countries such as Peru and Argentina. In Brazil, packed by the telenovela Despedida de Solteiro the single was her seventh number one in the country and the accompanying music video received extensive airplay and they are, to date, among Summer's most recognizable tunes.

Track listings
 1989 US 7" single
 "Breakaway" – 4:10
 "Thinkin' Bout My Baby" – 6:18

 1991 UK 7" single
 "Breakaway (Remix)" – 3:34 (remixed by Phil Harding & Ian Curnow)
 "Love Is In Control (Finger On The Trigger)" – 4:17

 1989 US 12" single
 "Breakaway (The Extended Power Mix)" – 6:08 (remixed by Tony Humphries)
 "Breakaway (The Power Radio Mix)" – 4:02 (remixed by Tony Humphries)
 "I Don't Wanna Get Hurt (12" Version)" – 6:58

 1991 UK 12" single / UK CD single
 "Breakaway (Remix Full Version)" – 6:44 (remixed by Phil Harding & Ian Curnow)
 "Breakaway (Remix Edit)" – 3:34 (remixed by Phil Harding & Ian Curnow)
 "Love Is In Control (Finger On The Trigger)" – 4:17

Charts

References

Donna Summer songs
Song recordings produced by Stock Aitken Waterman
Songs written by Pete Waterman
Songs written by Matt Aitken
Songs written by Mike Stock (musician)
1989 songs
Atlantic Records singles
Warner Records singles
1989 singles
1990 singles
1991 singles